Halecium is a genus of hydrozoans in the family Haleciidae, consisting of approximately 120 species. These marine invertebrates are found in all oceans, where they often form large colonies.

References

Haleciidae
Hydrozoan genera